Erika Kaar, born Erika Marta Karkuszewska, is a Polish actress.

Career
In 2018, she graduated from the Aleksander Zelwerowicz National Academy of Dramatic Art in Warsaw. Kaar's first screen role was in the 2014 BBC miniseries The Passing Bells, where she played a Polish nurse, the love interest of one of the two leads. She was a lead actress in the 2015 Polish television series Aż po sufit!  Her film debut was in the Indian Bollywood movie Shivaay (2016) directed by Ajay Devgan. In 2017, she appeared in Starz's TV series American Gods, playing Zorya Polunochnaya.

Personal life
Kaar married Maciej Bielski who is a lawyer in Warsaw.

Filmography

References

External links

Living people
1988 births
Actresses from Warsaw
Polish film actresses
Polish television actresses
Aleksander Zelwerowicz National Academy of Dramatic Art in Warsaw alumni
Polish expatriates in India
Actresses in Hindi cinema
European actresses in India
Actresses of European descent in Indian films
21st-century Polish actresses